Jack Heid (June 26, 1924 – May 27, 1987) was an American cyclist. He competed in the time trial and the sprint events at the 1948 Summer Olympics.

References

External links
 

1924 births
1987 deaths
American male cyclists
Olympic cyclists of the United States
Cyclists at the 1948 Summer Olympics
Sportspeople from New York City